The Spokane Street Viaduct is a freeway connecting the West Seattle Bridge to Interstate 5. It runs above South Spokane Street in the SoDo neighborhood of Seattle and is generally four to six lanes wide.

The viaduct was one of Seattle's first freeways, opened in 1945. Over the course of the next few decades, other traffic-separated roadways were built to create a continuous roadway between West Seattle and Beacon Hill, such as the "Fauntleroy-Southwest Spokane Street Viaduct" (which opened in 1965). Upon completion of the high-rise West Seattle Bridge in 1984, the road comprising the Spokane Street Viaduct, the West Seattle Bridge and the Fauntleroy-Southwest Spokane Street Viaduct was referred to as the "West Seattle Freeway". However, a series of fatalities led to recognition that the aging Spokane Street Viaduct portion was unsafe to be used as a high-speed roadway. In 1997, the Seattle City Council unanimously adopted a resolution to lower the speed limit and to request that the WSDOT remove the word "Freeway" from signs marking the entrances to the Spokane Street Viaduct and the West Seattle Bridge.

From 2008 to 2013, the Spokane Street Viaduct section between Interstate 5 and State Route 99 was rebuilt and widened. The widened roadway has three lanes in each direction and shoulders. A new westbound on and off ramp was built at 1st Ave S and replaced the dangerous 4th Ave S off-ramp. A new eastbound off-ramp to 4th Ave S opened August 16, 2010.

Exit list

See also

 West Spokane Street Bridge, a pair of bascule bridges built in the 1920s that were decommissioned by 1989.
 Spokane Street Bridge, a low bridge over the western fork of the Duwamish Waterway opened in 1991.

References

Bridges in Seattle
Roads in Washington (state)